Víctor Emanuel Aguilera (born 11 June 1989) is an Argentine professional footballer who plays as a centre-back for Club Atlético Tigre.

Career 
Aguilera began his professional career in 2007 at the age of 18 with Deportivo Guaymallén, with whom he played in over 70 matches. In 2010 he signed with Godoy Cruz of the Primera División, though was loaned out to second-division side Defensa y Justicia. He gained promotion with the club and went on to play in 57 matches  and scoring five goals. He returned to Godoy Cruz in 2014, though only managing four appearances.

In 2014, Aguilera joined Independiente for a reported sum of US$300,000 for 50 percent of the player's economic rights. He managed 22 league appearances with Independiente, and made his Copa Libertadores debut with the club.

On 24 June 2016, it was confirmed Aguilera had joined Mexican club Tijuana. The fee was reported to be in the region of US$2 million, with Tijuana obtaining 100 percent of his economic rights. He made his Liga MX debut on 15 June against Monarcas Morelia.

On 13 December 2017, Aguilera joined Club América, reuniting with former Tijuana manager Miguel Herrera.

Honours
América
Liga MX: Apertura 2018
Copa MX: Clausura 2019
Campeón de Campeones: 2019

Atlas
Liga MX: Clausura 2022
Campeón de Campeones: 2022

References

1989 births
Living people
Argentine expatriate footballers
Argentine footballers
Liga MX players
Argentine Primera División players
Godoy Cruz Antonio Tomba footballers
Defensa y Justicia footballers
Club Atlético Independiente footballers
Club Tijuana footballers
Club América footballers
Expatriate footballers in Mexico
Association football defenders
Sportspeople from Mendoza, Argentina